Mian Mohammad Aslam (born 1 April 1949) is a Pakistani former cricket umpire. He stood in eight Test matches between 1984 and 2001 and 18 ODI games between 1982 and 2002. He has worked as a chief organiser of Muslim Gymkhana, Lahore.

His brother, Mian Pervez Akhtar, was a match referee and coach at the Muslim Gymkhana, Lahore.

See also
 List of Test cricket umpires
 List of One Day International cricket umpires

References

1949 births
Living people
Cricketers from Lahore
Pakistani Test cricket umpires
Pakistani One Day International cricket umpires